George Landerkin (July 20, 1839 – October 4, 1903) was a Canadian physician and political figure. He represented Grey South in the House of Commons of Canada as a Liberal member from 1872 to 1878 and from 1882 to 1900. From 1901 to 1903, he was a member of the Senate of Canada.

He was born in West Gwillimbury, Simcoe County, Upper Canada, the son of James Landerkin, who came there from Nova Scotia. He was educated at Victoria College in Cobourg, where he received his M.D. Landerkin worked on a farm for several years before obtaining his medical degree. He practised medicine in Hanover, Ontario. Landerkin was also president of Canada Mutual Mining and Development Company. In 1870, he married Mary Matilda Kirkendall. Landerkin was defeated by George Jackson for the federal seat in 1878. He died in Hanover at the age of 64.

References 

1839 births
1903 deaths
Physicians from Simcoe County
Politicians from Simcoe County
Canadian senators from Ontario
Liberal Party of Canada MPs
Liberal Party of Canada senators
Members of the House of Commons of Canada from Ontario